Joe Butterfly is a 1957 American comedy film directed by Jesse Hibbs starring Audie Murphy, George Nader and Keenan Wynn, with Burgess Meredith in the title role as a Japanese man. The movie was action star Murphy's only outright comedy, and it suffered by comparison to the similar Teahouse of the August Moon, released seven months earlier. The film was based on an unproduced play.

Plot
The film follows the staff of the Army weekly magazine Yank, who are among the first American troops in Tokyo after Japan's surrender. They are given the difficult task of producing an issue of the magazine in three days. Short on ideas and having to meet the deadline, they enter Japan's black market and come across con artist Joe Butterfly. Butterfly shows them the high life, letting them live in a mansion complete with beautiful girls.

Cast
 Audie Murphy as Private John Woodley
 George Nader as Sergeant Ed Kennedy
 Keenan Wynn as Henry Hathaway
 Keiko Shima as Chieko
 Fred Clark as Colonel E. E. Fuller
 John Agar as Sergeant Dick Mason
 Charles McGraw as Sergeant Jim McNulty
 Shinpei Shimazaki as a little boy
 Reiko Higa as False Tokyo Rose
 Tatsuo Saitō as father
 Chizu Shimazaki as mother
 Herbert Anderson as Major Ferguson
 Eddie Firestone as Sergeant Oscar Hulick
 Frank Chase as Chief Yeoman Saul Bernheim
 Harold Goodwin as Colonel Hopper
 Willard Willingham as a soldier
 Burgess Meredith as Joe Butterfly

Production
The movie was shot partly in Hong Kong and Japan as well as aboard the USS Los Angeles. According to co-writer Sy Gomberg, Audie Murphy was extremely uncomfortable playing comedy. However, the movie was an enormous hit in Japan, in part because of the Japanese people's admiration for Murphy, and partly because of its sympathetic depiction of the Japanese. Following the film, Murphy brought home a 14-year-old Japanese girl who stayed with the Murphys and helped raise their children while she attended school in America.

The original choice for the title character was meant to be David Wayne who had appeared as Sakini in the stage production of Teahouse of the August Moon.  When he was unavailable the role was taken by Burgess Meredith who also played Sakini on stage.

See also
List of American films of 1957

References

External links

Joe Butterfly at TCMDB

1957 films
1957 comedy films
CinemaScope films
Audie Murphy
American comedy films
American crime films
Films set in Tokyo
Universal Pictures films
Films directed by Jesse Hibbs
American films based on plays
Films with screenplays by Jack Sher
Japan in non-Japanese culture
1950s English-language films
1950s American films